Raj Bharat is an Indian film director who primarily worked in Telugu and Tamil Movies. His notable movies include Yamakinkarudu and Puli with Chiranjeevi.

Filmography
Yamakinkarudu (1982)
Puli (1985)
Vadh (2002)

References

External links

Tamil film directors
Bharat, Raj October 26, 1991
Year of birth missing (living people)